Sarchal or Sar Chal may refer to:

Sar Chal, Kohgiluyeh and Boyer-Ahmad
Sar Chal, Markazi